The U.S. Collegiate Figure Skating Championships (previously National Collegiate Championships) are a collegiate figure skating competition sanctioned by U.S. Figure Skating.  It is the highest level at which figure skating takes place at the college level in the United States.  The event has been held since 1986.  The event takes place in August of the calendar year and generally at the beginning of the figure skating season.

Eligible skaters must be on the junior or senior levels and must be enrolled at a college or university. Skaters compete in the disciplines of men's singles and ladies singles.  Previous competitors include Paul Wylie, Nancy Kerrigan, Sydne Vogel, and Ryan Bradley.

The event was hosted by the Skating Club of Lake Placid in Lake Placid, NY or the Broadmoor Skating Club in Colorado Springs, CO until U.S. Figure Skating made the decision to have multiple clubs host the event in 2001.  In 2009, the Philadelphia Skating Club and Humane Society  hosted the event.  According to U.S. Figure Skating, the last compulsory figures competition at a national level was held at the 2000 United States Collegiate Figure Skating Championships in Colorado Springs, Colorado.

As of 2009, U.S. Figure Skating’s Athlete Development Committee announced that the top two senior ladies and men will be assigned to an international competition.

U.S. Collegiate Compulsory Figures Championship Results

U.S. Collegiate Figure Skating Championship Results

References

External links

See also
 

Figure skating in the United States
College sports championships in the United States
Figure